The Vegesack family is a Baltic German noble family of German origin, with presence in several European countries, and introduced at the Swedish house of nobility, and Livonian Knighthood.

Notable members 

 Eberhard von Vegesack
 Ernst von Vegesack
 Johan Fredrik Ernst von Vegesack

References

External links 

 Genealogy of von Vegesack

Swedish noble families
German noble families
Livonian noble families
Swedish families of Baltic German ancestry